Charles I. Schottland (October 29, 1906 – June 27, 1995) was an American administrator who served as the Commissioner of the Social Security Administration from 1954 to 1958 and as the President of Brandeis University from 1970 to 1972.

He died on June 27, 1995, in Tucson, Arizona at age 88.

References

1906 births
1995 deaths
Commissioners of the Social Security Administration
Presidents of Brandeis University